Autódromo Velo Città is a  motor racing circuit that is located on a private property in the municipality of Mogi Guaçu, São Paulo, Brazil,  from the capital of São Paulo.

With a focus on competitions and closed events such as track days, test drives, press conferences and driving courses, the race track has hosted numerous events since its inauguration, among them: 1000 Brazilian Historic Miles, 500Km from São Paulo, Classic Cup, Porsche GT3 Cup Brasil, Lancer Cup, several releases from the automotive industry such as Suzuki, Bentley, Pirelli, Michelin, Continental Tires, Mitsubishi Motors, Mini, Jaguar, Land Rover, Mercedes-Benz, Audi, BMW, Renault, Nissan, Ferrari, Peugeot, Fiat, Chevrolet, Volkswagen, Ford, Honda, Yamaha, Triumph and many others.

History
In June 2012, the site was approved by the CBA. Then, the project and the plans were sent to the FIA (Fédération Internationale de l'Automobile). The material underwent a computerized evaluation that verified the basic items. With the validation of the system, Velo Città received a visit from an inspector, who attested it to be able to receive international competitions in Touring and GT racing, in October 2013. 

In 2014, the paddock on the pits was opened, with the capacity to receive around 500 VIP guests with the most privileged view of the track and also the race steering tower. In March 2015, the new Capirinha and Ferradura curves were inaugurated, making the circuit more challenging and faster in professional competition events. In 2015, the  offroad track and 18 obstacles were prepared to show what a 4x4 vehicle or a bigtrail motorcycle is capable of facing.

In April 2017, Velo Città hosted three simultaneous events: Mitsubishi Motorsports, Mitsubishi Outdoor and the Mitsubishi Cup. In August of that year, the first race of the largest category of Brazilian motorsport was held, the Stock Car. Along with it, the Mercedes-Benz Challenge and Copa Petrobrás de Marcas category completed the program, which could be checked closely by the public, who attended the event in a grandstand built especially for the occasion. In September 2018, it had its second Stock Car race in Mogi Guaçu. In 2019, important races took place on the track, including the third race of Stock Car and the Old Stock Race in celebration of the category's 40th anniversary.

Layouts
It is not a high track, with most medium and low speed curves.

Lap records
The official fastest lap records at the Autódromo Velo Città are listed as:

Notes

References 

Sports venues completed in 2012
Velo Citta